The Canton of Plombières-les-Bains is a French former administrative and electoral grouping of communes in the Vosges département of eastern France and in the region of Lorraine. It was disbanded following the French canton reorganisation which came into effect in March 2015. It consisted of 4 communes, which joined the canton of Le Val-d'Ajol in 2015. It had 7,080 inhabitants (2012).
   
One of 13 cantons in the Arrondissement of Épinal, the Canton of Plombières-les-Bains had its administrative centre at Plombières-les-Bains.

Composition
The Canton of Plombières-les-Bains comprised the following 4 communes:
Bellefontaine
Girmont-Val-d'Ajol
Plombières-les-Bains
Le Val-d'Ajol

References

Plombieres-les-Bains
2015 disestablishments in France
States and territories disestablished in 2015